Linzi may refer to:
Ancient Linzi, capital of the ancient state of Qi
Linzi District, the modern district of Zibo, Shandong in the same location